Freziera roraimensis is a species of plant in the Pentaphylacaceae family. It is endemic to Venezuela.

References

Endemic flora of Venezuela
roraimensis
Critically endangered plants
Taxonomy articles created by Polbot
Taxa named by Edmond Tulasne